Michal Jonec (born 30 July 1996) is a Slovak footballer who currently plays for FC Košice as a defender.

Club career

MFK Košice
Jonec made his Fortuna Liga debut for MFK Košice on 19 May 2015 against ŽP Šport Podbrezová in a 5:0 home victory. He replaced Milan Dimun 59 minutes into the game.

References

External links
 Eurofotbal profile
 
 Futbalnet profile

1996 births
Living people
Sportspeople from Košice
Slovak footballers
Association football defenders
FC VSS Košice players
MFK Ružomberok players
FC Košice (2018) players
Slovak Super Liga players
2. Liga (Slovakia) players